Tinsley is an unincorporated community located in Yazoo County, Mississippi, United States.

History
Tinsley had a post office, several stores, and a population of 50 in 1907.

In 1939, Tinsley Oil Field, located south of the settlement, was the site of the first commercial discovery of oil in Mississippi.

A line of the Illinois Central Railroad passes through Tinsley.  In 1941, a freight train rear-ended another freight train at Tinsley.  The impact derailed 28 cars, including 13 carrying molasses.

Education
Residents are a part of the Yazoo County School District, and are zoned to Yazoo County Middle School and Yazoo County High School.

See also
 Jackson Volcano
 Mississippi embayment

References

Unincorporated communities in Yazoo County, Mississippi
Unincorporated communities in Mississippi